Kristīne Kārkliņa (born September 30, 1983 in Riga) is a Latvian women's basketball player currently playing for TTT Riga and Latvia women's national basketball team. She joined TTT Riga in 2009. Previously she had played for SK Cēsis, as well as several other local and foreign clubs before 2000.

Niedola contributed to the successes of the team in EuroBasket 2009.

Achievements
 2009 – 9th place in Eurobasket Women with Latvia women's national basketball team.

References

External links
Profile at FIBA Europe page

1983 births
Living people
Basketball players from Riga
Latvian women's basketball players
Point guards